Horsemint may refer to:

Mentha longifolia, a wild mint, which is also known in England as Horsemint.
Any plant in the genus Monarda, native to North America.
Agastache urticifolia, mint family plant of the Great Basin in western United States